Esteban Bustos Rodríguez (born December 16, 1992) is a modern pentathlete from Chile. He was born in Santiago. He won a bronze medal at the 2011 Pan American Games in Guadalajara, Mexico, and received an automatic qualifying berth for the 2012 Summer Olympics in London, following the footsteps of his brother Cristián, who had previously competed in Beijing, four years before.

Bustos was selected to be one of the thirty-six athletes to participate in the men's modern pentathlon. During the competition, Bustos performed disastrously at the initial stages, with fair scores in a one-touch épée fencing, and 200 m freestyle swimming, but maintained his pace for the tenth position in horse-riding and newly combined running and laser shooting. After completing all the segments, Bustos finished eighteenth in the men's event at his first Olympics.

He competed at the 2020 Summer Olympics.

References

External links
  (archived page from Pentathlon.org)

1992 births
Living people
Chilean male modern pentathletes
Olympic modern pentathletes of Chile
Modern pentathletes at the 2012 Summer Olympics
Pan American Games bronze medalists for Chile
Sportspeople from Santiago
Pan American Games medalists in modern pentathlon
Modern pentathletes at the 2015 Pan American Games
South American Games bronze medalists for Chile
South American Games gold medalists for Chile
South American Games medalists in modern pentathlon
Competitors at the 2014 South American Games
Competitors at the 2018 South American Games
Modern pentathletes at the 2019 Pan American Games
Medalists at the 2019 Pan American Games
Modern pentathletes at the 2020 Summer Olympics
21st-century Chilean people